The Nickel District Conservation Authority is a conservation authority in Greater Sudbury, Ontario. Formed in 1973 by the merger of two former conservation authorities in the region, the Junction Creek Conservation Authority in Sudbury and the Whitson Valley Conservation Authority in Valley East, the authority oversees the conservation, restoration, development and management of natural resources in the Sudbury area.

It also manages the Lake Laurentian Conservation Area in Sudbury.

The authority is overseen by a seven-member board appointed by the City of Greater Sudbury.

External links
 Nickel District Conservation Authority

Conservation authorities in Ontario
Municipal government of Greater Sudbury
Organizations based in Greater Sudbury
1973 establishments in Ontario
Organizations established in 1973